Avadi railway station is one of the major railway termini of the Chennai Central–Arakkonam section of the Chennai Suburban Railway Network. It serves the neighbourhood of Avadi, a suburb of Chennai located 23 km west of the city centre. It is situated at Tirumalairajapuram locality of Avadi, with an elevation of 26.85 m above sea level. According to a railway release in 2008, there are plans to develop Avadi station as a coaching terminal (satellite terminal) for Chennai Central railway station, on the lines of Tambaram station being developed as a terminal for Egmore railway station.

History
The first lines in the station were electrified on 29 November 1979, with the electrification of the Chennai Central–Tiruvallur section. The EMU car shed lines at Avadi were electrified on 1 February 1980. Additional lines at the station were electrified on 2 October 1986, with the electrification of the Villivakkam–Avadi section.

The electrification preliminaries, such as poles, were observed on the railway lines passing through Avadi Railway Station as early as 1977. The first broad-gauge electric EMUs were first introduced on the Madras Central–Gummidipoondi section by 1979 and in the next phase on the Madras Central–Tiruvallur section around 1980. From around 1971 to 1980, there these beastly WP steam locomotives that were hauling the Suburban trains going up to Tiruvallur and Gumidipoondi. The WDS category shuttle diesel were seen pulling the Pattabiram Military Siding trains going up to E Depot in the Avadi Air Force Station Cantonment Area. It helped identifying the trains. As for the express trains passing through Avadi, those were diesel electrics. In the late 1960s and early 1970s, it was probably the Baldwin Class WP steam locos that were hauling trains such as Dadar Express and Bombay Mail from Kalyan, taking over the duties from the mighty WCM DC Electrics operating on the Bombay–Kalyan route.

Layout
The station has six tracks, including two loop lines, and has four platforms. The first platform is a side platform housing the station's entrance and the ticket counter, and the second and third are part of an island platform. The fourth platform borders the northern end of the station and is the longest of all the platforms. The platforms are connected by means of a footbridge.

As of 2013, the station handles about 40,000 passengers a day.

Developments
Avadi is one of the railway stations in the Chennai Suburban Railway network that are being developed as Adarsh stations.

See also

 Chennai Suburban Railway
 Railway stations in Chennai

References

External links
 Avadi station at Indiarailinfo.com

Stations of Chennai Suburban Railway
Railway stations in Chennai
Railway stations in Tiruvallur district